This is a list of types of Waivers

United States government
 Visa Waiver Program, U.S. government system, allowing citizens of other countries to travel to the United States
 United States Waiver of Inadmissibility, application for legal entry to the United States
 Moral waiver, allows acceptance of a recruit into the U.S. military services
 Felony waiver, special permission to allow a U.S. military recruit who has a felony on their record
 Forfeiture and waiver, concepts used by the United States court system

Other uses
 Florida Medicaid waiver, covering medical supports and services
 Whitewash waiver, proposed resolution regarding stockholder rights
 Liability waiver, such as pre-accident releases
 Damage waiver, optional collision coverage when renting a vehicle

Waivers